Hockey at the 1972 Olympics may refer to:

Ice hockey at the 1972 Winter Olympics
Field hockey at the 1972 Summer Olympics